There are 40 female chess players who hold the title of Grandmaster (GM), the highest title awarded by the International Chess Federation (FIDE). The Grandmaster title was formally established by FIDE in 1950. Modern regulations typically require players to achieve a FIDE rating of 2500 and three tournament norms that include a GM-level performance rating of 2600 to be awarded the title, although there are various exceptions. Since 1993, players who win the Women's World Championship are directly awarded the Grandmaster title. Like all FIDE titles, the Grandmaster title is awarded for life and does not require a player to maintain a performance level or remain active after the award.

Nona Gaprindashvili, a Soviet chess player from Georgia, was the first woman to become a grandmaster in 1978, receiving the title largely by virtue of being the first woman to achieve a GM norm a year earlier. In 1991, Susan Polgar became the first woman to achieve the Grandmaster title through three norms based on performance rating. Later that year at age 15, her younger sister Judit Polgár became the youngest grandmaster in history among men or women, breaking the previous record set by Bobby Fischer. Although there were a mere six female grandmasters by 2000 and the number of female grandmasters has never been more than a few percent of the total, the turn of the century saw a substantial increase in the number of women to be awarded the title. This increase in the number of grandmasters has made it possible to stage women-only round-robin tournaments such as FIDE Women's Grand Prix events that feature predominantly grandmasters. At the same time, in an era where the Grandmaster title is no longer indicative of the upper echelon of chess overall, Hou Yifan has been the only player since 2000 to join Judit Polgár and Maia Chiburdanidze as female grandmasters who have been ranked in the top 100 among all players.

As of 2022, all female grandmasters were alive, and the vast majority who obtained the title since 2000 were still active. China and Russia have the most female grandmasters, and six countries have more than one. Nearly all female grandmasters are from Europe or Asia, and Irina Krush of the United States is the only one from another continent. Judit Polgár's record for the youngest female grandmaster was beaten in 2002 by Koneru Humpy and was lowered again in 2008 by Hou Yifan, who became a grandmaster at age 14.

Background

Birth of the Grandmaster title
The International Chess Federation (FIDE) was established in 1924 as the governing body of competitive chess. At the time, the term "grandmaster" was already being informally used to describe the world's leading chess players since the players competing in the Championship section of the Ostend 1907 chess tournament were referred to as "grandmasters" in reference to them all having previously won international tournaments. Separate from FIDE, the Soviet Union also designated their own grandmasters as early as 1927. Informal use of the term continued until 1950 when FIDE officially awarded the Grandmaster (GM) title to 27 of the world's top past and present players who were still alive, none of whom were women. Vera Menchik, who regularly competed against high-level male players and was the only Women's World Champion before that year, was not considered because she had already been killed in World War II.

FIDE first established formal criteria for the Grandmaster title in 1953. These criteria included precursors to the modern-day concept of norms in that the requirements depended on a player's score in a few individual tournaments with a specified percentage of titled players. FIDE modified these criteria to have GM norms (then called GM results) take into account a tournament's average rating of the competing players in 1970 when they first adopted an Elo rating system. No earlier than 1977, FIDE added a requirement that players must achieve a FIDE rating of 2450, a threshold that was later increased to the modern-day requirement of 2500. Modern GM norms that require a performance rating of 2600 are still based on a player's score, but instead depend on the average rating of the player's opponents rather than all of the players in the tournament.

Earliest female grandmasters

Beginning in the 1960s, Nona Gaprindashvili was the first woman since Menchik to be competitive against high-level male players. At the 1977 Lone Pine International after about 15 years as Women's World Champion, she became the first woman to achieve a GM norm. Gaprindashvili compiled a performance rating of 2647 and scored 6½/9 to finish in joint first with three others, including GMs Yuri Balashov and Oscar Panno. After she missed a second GM norm by a ½ point in 1978, FIDE nonetheless decided to award her the Grandmaster title amidst more rule changes that may have made it more difficult for her to obtain the title in the future. Maia Chiburdanidze succeeded her compatriot Gaprindashvili as Women's World Champion in 1978 and became the second woman to obtain the Grandmaster title in 1984 through her three World Championship match wins. Later on, she also became the first woman ranked in the top 100, peaking at No. 43 in 1988.

Following these first two female grandmasters from Georgia, the Polgár sisters ended the Soviet Union's four-decades-long domination over women's chess as all three sisters helped lead Hungary to the gold medal at the 1988 Women's Chess Olympiad and Susan Polgar had already become the top-rated female chess player in 1984 at age 15. Between 1988 and 1989, all three of Susan, Sofia, and Judit Polgár earned their first GM norms as teenagers in open tournaments in Royan, Rome, and Amsterdam respectively, the middle of which drew widespread attention because of Sofia's very high performance rating of around 2900, well above the norm requirement. Judit was also already ranked in the top 100 in 1989 at the age of 12, and later peaked at No. 8 in the world in 2003. In 1991, both Susan and Judit achieved the Grandmaster title. Susan was the third female grandmaster, and the first to earn the title by achieving three conventional GM norms and satisfying the rating requirement. Judit achieved her final GM norm as part of her victory in the open Hungarian Championship to become the fourth female grandmaster. At the age of 15 years and 5 months, she also became the youngest grandmaster in history, breaking Bobby Fischer's previous record from 1958 of 15 years and 6 months. She held the overall record for a little over two years. Pia Cramling and Xie Jun soon followed in obtaining the Grandmaster title in the next few years, and were the last two to do so before 2000. Xie was the first female grandmaster from outside Europe and the second grandmaster from China overall.

21st century

After over six years without another woman achieving the Grandmaster title, the next century saw a much larger influx of new female grandmasters. Once Zhu Chen ended that stretch in 2001, the next two decades rarely saw gaps of more than a year without a new female grandmaster. Judit Polgár's record as the youngest female grandmaster lasted a little over a decade until it was broken by Koneru Humpy in 2002 at the age of 15 years and 1 month. Hou Yifan then became the youngest female grandmaster in 2008 at 14 years and 6 months. Hou also reached the top 100 in 2014, peaking at No. 55 a year later. At some point by 2003, FIDE changed their regulations and began awarding the Grandmaster title to players who win the Women's World Championship if they are not already grandmasters. Since then, four players have obtained the Grandmaster title in this manner, most recently Tan Zhongyi in 2017. The Kosintseva sisters Tatiana and Nadezhda as well as the Muzychuk sisters Anna and Mariya both joined Susan and Judit Polgár as pairs of sisters to both be awarded the Grandmaster title. Irina Krush was the first player from outside Europe or Asia to be awarded the title in 2013.

With the increase in number of female grandmasters, it has been possible to stage women-only round-robin tournaments featuring mostly grandmasters. These include some of the FIDE Women's Grand Prix events that have been held since 2009 and the Cairns Cup that began in 2019. All but one of the ten players in the 2020 Cairns Cup were grandmasters. When the Candidates tournament was revived in 2019 to decide the next World Championship challenger, all of the competitors were grandmasters rated above 2500. While there has continued to be more female grandmasters, the rate of new women to achieve the title has thus far peaked a little before the 2010s. As the overall number of grandmasters has increased from about 300 in 1990 to over 1700 by 2020, women still make up no more than a few percent of the total.

Title requirements

Regulations (2022–present)

The modern requirements as of 2022 to obtain the Grandmaster title are essentially to reach a minimum FIDE rating of 2500 and achieve three tournament GM norms, albeit there are exceptions.

FIDE ranks players according to their official FIDE ratings published each month. These ratings are determined using an Elo rating system, which was first implemented in 1970. They depend only on the results of individual games at FIDE-rated tournaments. For a player who has previously been rated above 2400 playing against an opponent with an identical rating, a win is worth 5 rating points, a draw is worth 0 rating points, and a loss is worth -5 rating points. These values increase against higher-rated opponents and decrease against lower-rated opponents. Players can gain or lose no more than 10 rating points for a win or a loss respectively, and can gain or lose no more than 5 rating points for a draw. Although FIDE ratings are only published at the start of every month, the required rating for the Grandmaster title of 2500 can be achieved in the middle of a rating period or even the middle of a tournament.

A norm is a performance at a title level at a FIDE-rated tournament. Players need to have a performance rating of at least 2600 to achieve a GM norm at a tournament. A player's performance rating depends on their score in the tournament and the average rating of their opponents. The player's score is converted to a rating difference according to a published conversion table of values, and that rating difference is added to their opponents' average rating to compute their performance rating. For example, some of the scores a player may need to achieve a GM norm in a nine-round tournament are 7/9 against 2380-rated opponents, 6½/9 against 2434-rated opponents, or 4½/9 against 2600-rated opponents. Moreover, there are other requirements such as having one-third of a player's opponents be grandmasters. Although players generally need three GM norms, the exact requirement is for them to have 27 games between all of their norms. As a result, they may need one extra norm if their tournaments are shorter than the usual required length of at least nine games.

A player can circumvent these requirements and achieve a norm or be awarded the title directly if they achieve certain results at specified tournaments. The regulation that has been most relevant to female players is that any winner of the Women's World Championship who is not already a grandmaster is directly awarded the Grandmaster title. Any runner-up receives a GM norm.

Previous regulations
Winning the Women's World Championship did not always confer a direct award of the title. Around the time Maia Chiburdanidze was world champion, each World Championship match win only resulted in a norm and thus three match wins or other norms were needed to obtain the title. Around the time Xie Jun was world champion, only two World Championship match wins were required to obtain the title. Beginning in 1993, the requirements changed to a direct award of the Grandmaster title simply for winning the championship.

In the past, FIDE had counted norms at the Chess Olympiad and continental championships as "double norms" over 20 games. As a result, it was common for players to need only one additional norm plus the rating requirement if they earned a norm at the Women's Chess Olympiad or the European Individual Women's Chess Championship (EWCC). This regulation for the Olympiad began in 2005 and was discontinued in 2017. The regulation for the continental championships was discontinued earlier in 2014. Previously from 2003 to 2005, players could be directly awarded the Grandmaster title if they achieved just the performance rating of 2600 required for a typical GM norm, a feat known as a GM performance, over at least 12 games at a continental championship.

Key

Grandmasters

Federation switches:

Direct awards:

Multiple reigns of the Women's World Championship:

By year

The following chart illustrates the total number of female grandmasters by year based on the date when each player achieved the GM title (the title date).

By title age

The following chart illustrates the cumulative number of female grandmasters by age based on the date when each player achieved the GM title (the title date).

By country

The following table shows the number of active female grandmasters from each national federation, as well as the count of all female grandmasters according to their current federation, their federation at the time they were awarded the title, and the overall total.

See also

 Women in chess
 Grandmaster (chess)
 List of female chess players
 List of chess grandmasters

Notes

References

Books

External links
 List of female grandmasters from FIDE
 FIDE title applications
 FIDE handbook

Lists of chess players
Chess
Women's chess